Zeher: A Love Story is a 2005 Indian Hindi-language mystery thriller film directed by debutant Mohit Suri and produced by Mahesh Bhatt. The film stars Emraan Hashmi, Shamita Shetty and Udita Goswami. It is an adaptation of the 2003 American film Out of Time.

Plot
In a small town in Goa steeped in azure seas and sultry secrets, the chief of local police station, Siddharth finds himself caught in the midst of a brewing storm. He is going through a divorce with his wife, Sonia whom he still loves, but finds himself involved with a local married woman named Anna. Unable to cope with the pressures of his wife's success who is in the special police force, he continues his secret relationship with Anna.

Things get even more complicated when Siddharth realizes that Anna's husband, Sean is abusive and Anna is dying from cancer. Being a good soul, Siddharth does not have it in him to abandon this woman who seems to have given him some affection in recent times.

In the heat of the moment, Siddharth takes an irrational decision to give Anna the money he recovered in a drug raid, for her medication in a final effort to save her. Things are not what they seem since Anna dies in a fire that very night. Siddharth now races to uncover a murky tail of drug money, murder and deceit, because all the evidence points to him.

With Sonia heads the case, Siddharth is now in a race against time to find out the real truth behind Anna's murder, recover the drug money and also win his Sonia's love back.

After a bunch of wild goose chases, Siddharth finds out that Anna is alive and was actually controlling Sean and Siddharth in the whole plot for getting the insurance money. Siddharth finds this out and while confronting Anna with the truth, Anna points a gun at him. In the scuffle that follows, Sonia shoots Anna and she provides the alibi for him stating that Anna's death was an accident.

The movie ends with Siddharth recovering the lost drug money and reconciling with Sonia.

Cast
Emraan Hashmi as Siddharth Mehra: Police Officer, Sonia's husband
Shamita Shetty as Sonia Mehra: Special Investigating Officer, Siddharth’s wife
Udita Goswami as Anna Varghese
Samir Kochhar as Sean Varghese
Ninad Kamat as James: Siddharth’s friend
Vishwajeet Pradhan as Sooraj Shah: Narcotics Inspector
Prasad Oak as Nihaal: Sonia's assistant
Puneet Vashist as Rahul Varma
Kunal Deshmukh
Nikhil Ratnaparakhi

Soundtrack

The soundtrack of Zeher was composed by Anu Malik, Roop Kumar Rathod, Mithoon, Jal: the Band and Naresh Sharma with lyrics were penned by Sayeed Quadri and Shakeel Azmi.

According to the Indian trade website Box Office India, with around  units sold, this film's soundtrack album was the year's fourth highest-selling.

Awards
Nominations: 
 Filmfare Award for Best Male Playback Singer (2005) – Atif Aslam
 Filmfare Award for Best Female Playback Singer (2005) – Shreya Ghosal
 Zee Cine Award for Best Popular Track of the Year (2005)
 Zee Cine Award for Best Playback Singer – Male (2005) – Atif Aslam
 IIFA Award for Best Male Playback Singer (2006) – Atif Aslam
 Screen Award for Best Debut Director (2006) – Mohit Suri
 Screen Award for Best Playback Singer – Male (2006) – Atif Aslam

References

External links
 

2005 films
2000s Hindi-language films
Films scored by Mithoon
Films scored by Anu Malik
Indian mystery thriller films
Films shot in Goa
Indian erotic thriller films
2000s erotic thriller films
2005 directorial debut films
2000s mystery thriller films
Indian remakes of American films
Films directed by Mohit Suri
Indian crime thriller films
Films about infidelity
Films about drugs
Films about organised crime in India